Kerala Blasters Football Club is an Indian professional football club based in Kochi, Kerala. The club was established on 27 May 2014 and competes in the Indian Super League, the top division league of Indian football. They play their home matches at the Jawaharlal Nehru Stadium in Kochi with an average attendance of 50000 almost in every season.

Managerial history

The club's current head coach is Ivan Vukomanović, who took over the charge on 17 June 2021. There have been eight permanent, two interim and one caretaker manager for Kerala Blasters since its inception. The club's longest-serving manager, in terms of both length of tenure and number of games overseen is former England international David James.

2014 season

On 13 August 2014, former England international goalkeeper, David James, was announced as the first head coach of the Blasters and the first marquee player in team history, thus coming in as a player-head coach. The Blasters finished at 4th position and qualified for semifinal. The Blasters won the first leg at home 3–0. During the second leg in Chennai, the Blasters suffered a massive scare. Despite entering the second leg with the three goal advantage, Chennaiyin managed to draw the tie level by winning in regular time 3–0 themselves. However, in extra-time, the Blasters managed to strike back and score the decisive goal in the 117th minute from Stephen Pearson to win the tie 4–3 and thus enter the final.

In the final, the Blasters took on Atlético de Kolkata at the DY Patil Stadium in Mumbai. Despite holding on for ninety minutes, it was Atlético de Kolkata that came out on top with a Mohammed Rafique goal in the 95th minute earning the Kolkata side the title with a 1–0 victory.

2015 season

After the 2014 season, it was announced that David James would not return to the club as head coach and marquee player. On 12 May 2015 it was announced that former England U20 head coach Peter Taylor would take over as the Blasters head coach.

The first match of the season was played at the Jawaharlal Nehru Stadium, with the Blasters hosting NorthEast United. However, the Blasters followed that victory drawing their next match against Mumbai City and then losing their next four matches which eventually led to the dismissal of Peter Taylor as head coach. Assistant coach Trevor Morgan was in charge for one match before Terry Phelan was named head coach for the rest of the season. Fortunes failed to change for the Kerala Blasters as the club ended their second season in last place, failing to qualify for the Indian Super League finals.

2016 season

On 21 June 2016 Blasters announced the signing of former Crystal Palace manager Steve Coppell as their head coach. After the first month of the season, the Blasters had one of the best defenses statistically in the league but struggled to find the back of the net. In the second half of the season, after the return of C.K. Vineeth from loan with Bengaluru FC, the Blasters managed to surge their way into the finals.

In the final, the Kerala Blasters would play host to Atlético de Kolkata.The match went into a penalty shootout, Despite taking the lead early in the shootout, the Blasters lost 4–3 and thus were defeated in their second final in three seasons.

2017-18 season

On 14 July 2017, René Meulensteen was appointed as head coach of Kerala Blasters. Dimitar Berbatov signed with Blasters on 23 August 2017 on a one-year deal for a salary of ₹7.5 crore (approximately £900,000). On 2 January 2018, René Meulensteen step back from head coach position due to personal issues. David James was signed on 3 January 2018, for the rest of the season. Kerala Blasters finished at 6th position on the table and did not qualify for playoffs.

2018-19 season

Blasters signed three and a half years agreement with David James. But was sacked due to poor performance, discontinued from 18 December 2018. Former NEUFC head coach Nelo Vingada was signed for the rest of the season. The Blasters finished at 9th position on the table with only 2 wins from 18 games and did not qualify for playoffs.

2019-20 season

Blasters brought in Dutchman Eelco Schattorie as their new manager with a long term. Having previously coached other Indian clubs like East Bengal, United S.C and Northeast United. Blasters started the season with a win against ATK FC at home but then had a 9 winless run and inconsistent performance along with injury issues. At the end, the Blasters finished the season at 7th position with only 4 wins in 18 matches.

2020-21 season

On 2020 April, the Blasters announced that Kibu Vicuña has been appointed as their manager for the 2020-21 season. After 18 games under Kibu, the Blasters only had 16 points losing which eventually led to the dismissal of Kibu vicuna as head coach. Assistant coach Ishaq Ahmed was in charge for the last two matches of the season. They finished in 10th place in the table.<ref>{{Cite web|title=NorthEast United defended really well' - Kerala Blasters interim boss Ishfaq Ahmed credits high-flying Highlanders  Goal.com|url=https://www.goal.com/en/news/ishfaq-ahmed-kerala-blasters-credit-to-northeast-united/1p1nykk8cw1r61bnr402z73u58|access-date=2021-03-14|website=www.goal.com}}</ref>

2021-22 season

On 17 June 2021, Ivan Vukomanović was appointed as the head coach of Kerala Blasters. Under Vukomanović, on 11 September 2021, Kerala Blasters won their first game of the season in the 2021 Durand Cup match against Indian Navy with a score of 0–3 at full-time. Vukomanović's first Indian Super League match as the Blasters' manager ended in 4–2 defeat against ATK Mohun Bagan FC on 19 November. The following two games saw Blasters drawing against NorthEast United FC and Bengaluru FC respectively. It was on 5 December that Vukomanović's Blasters side saw their first league win as they defeated Odisha FC by 2–1. This victory was Kerala Blasters' first Indian Super League victory in 11 months. The Blasters' winning streak continued as they won back-to-back games against defending champions Mumbai City FC, and against rivals Chennaiyin FC, and thereby entering the top four in the table. The Blasters extended their unbeaten steak under Vukomanović to ten, when they won back-to-back games against Hyderabad FC on 9 January 2022, and against Odisha three days later, which helped the Blasters to move to the first spot in table after a long time of 7 years during the middle of the season. The Blasters unbeaten streak of ten match under Vukomanović ended with their 0–1 defeat over the arch-rivals Bengaluru on 30 January 2022. On 5 March, Blasters side qualified for the playoffs for the first time since 2016. With the end of the regular phase of the season, Vukomanović's Blasters side broke many club records in terms of number of wins, goals, clean-sheets, points-per-game, and achieved a positive goal difference for the first time in the club's history. Under Vukomanović, the club qualified for the finals of the ISL for the first time in 6 years after defeating Jamshedur FC on an aggregate score of 2–1 from both legs. Kerala Blasters played Hyderabad in the final on 20 March, which they lost in the penalty shoot-out after the allotted extra time went goalless, as both sides ended the match 1–1 at 120 minutes.

Managers and statisticsOnly competitive matches are taken into account. Durand cup matches played by the reserve team are not taken into account.
Table headers
 Nationality – If the manager played international football as a player, the country/countries he played for are shown. Otherwise, the manager's nationality is given as their country of birth.
 From – The year of the manager's first game for Kerala Blasters.
 To – The year of the manager's last game for Kerala Blasters.
 P – The number of games managed for Kerala Blasters.
 W – The number of games won as a manager.
 D – The number of games draw as a manager.
 L – The number of games lost as a manager.
 GF – The number of goals scored under his management.
 GA – The number of goals conceded under his management.
 Win% – The total winning percentage under his management.

Assistant ManagersThe following is a list of all the persons who worked as an Assistant Manager for the club.Trevor Morgan (2014–2015)
Jamie McAllister (2014)
  Ishfaq Ahmed (2015–2017) (2019–)
  Wally Downes (2016–2017)
  Wim Suurbier (2017)
  Iain Shaw (2017)
  Thangboi Singto (2017–2019)
  Hermann Hreidarsson (2017–2018)
  João Arnaldo Correia de Carvalho (2019)
  Francisco Bruto Da Costa (2019) 
  Shaun Ontong (2019–2020)
  Shameel Chembakath (2020)
  Guillermo Sanchez (2020) 
   Tomasz Tchórz (2020–2021)
  Patrick Van Kets (2021)
 Stéphane van der Heyden (2021–2022)
 Frank Dauwen (2022–)

Managerial recordsNote: Interim managers and caretakers have been excluded from the listAs of 3M March 2023''

Most Matches Managed:
  Ivan Vukomanović– 46
Least Matches Managed:
  Peter Taylor– 6
Most Wins:
  Ivan Vukomanović–21
Most Defeats
  Ivan Vukomanović– 16
Highest Win Percentage:
  Ivan Vukomanović– 44.68
Least Win Percentage:
  René Meulensteen– 14.29
Most Matches As Assistant Manager:
  Ishfaq Ahmed

See also
Kerala Blasters
Kerala Blasters FC Reserves and Academy
List of Kerala Blasters FC players
List of Kerala Blasters FC records and statistics
List of Kerala Blasters FC Seasons
Kerala Blasters FC results by opponent

References

External links 

Kerala Blasters FC
Coaches